Thomas Hoare or Hore may refer to:

Thomas Hoare (mercenary), known as Mike
Thomas Hore, MP
Thomas Hoare, one of the Candidates of the New South Wales state election, 1922